WITW-LP (93.5 FM) is a low power radio station licensed to Valparaiso, Indiana, United States.  The station airs a Contemporary Christian music format and is owned by The Book of Life Bible Institute, Inc. The station began broadcasting in January 2003. On June 10, 2018, the station went off the air when a fire destroyed the building housing the station's transmitter. The FCC granted the station's request to remain silent.

The station resumed broadcast operations on June 2, 2019.

In February 2021 the station obtain new automation and stereo processing software. The new upgrade started operation as of March 19, 2021.

Currently the station features “top of the hour” news from Salem Network News and a local production called “Lynn's List” with new current Contemporary Christian music. The station has been upgraded and now includes a up to date digital service with RDS data and ID/format info.

References

External links
 

Contemporary Christian radio stations in the United States
ITW
Radio stations established in 2003
2003 establishments in Indiana
ITW-LP